Benny Sichuundu Muziyo (born 8 November 1992) is a Zambian boxer. Muziyo won bronze in the men's middleweight event at the 2014 Commonwealth Games.

He competed in the men's middleweight event at the 2016 Summer Olympics. He secured his spot via an invitation from the Tripartite Commission. He lost a close split decision to Turkey's Önder Şipal after knocking down Şipal in the second round in his first Olympic bout.

In the 2018 Commonwealth Games he reached the quarter finals after scoring a knockout victory over Dominica's Roy Cooke in the round of 16. He was defeated 5-0 by eventual gold medalist Vikas Krishan Yadav of India in the quarter finals.

References

External links
 

1992 births
Living people
Zambian male boxers
Olympic boxers of Zambia
Boxers at the 2016 Summer Olympics
Commonwealth Games bronze medallists for Zambia
Boxers at the 2014 Commonwealth Games
Boxers at the 2018 Commonwealth Games
Place of birth missing (living people)
Boxers at the 2010 Summer Youth Olympics
Commonwealth Games medallists in boxing
African Games bronze medalists for Zambia
African Games medalists in boxing
People from Kafue District
Competitors at the 2015 African Games
Middleweight boxers
Medallists at the 2014 Commonwealth Games